Marián Mitaš (born 24 September 1980) is a Slovak actor, radio DJ and puppeteer.

Selected filmography 
Time of the Wolf (2003)
Mesto tieňov (television, 2008)
The House (2011)
Candidate (2013)
Búrlivé víno (television, 2014–2015)
Home Care (2015)
Legends 2  (television USA, 2015)
Milada (2017)
DOGG (2017)
The Zookeper's Wife (2017)
Milenky (television, 2018)
Toman (2018)
The Glass Room (2018)
Oteckovia (television, 2018–present)

References

External links

1980 births
People from Považská Bystrica
Living people
Slovak male film actors
Slovak male stage actors
Slovak male television actors
Puppeteers
20th-century Slovak male actors
21st-century Slovak male actors